The Carchi River is a river of Ecuador. It rises on the slopes of Chiles Volcano, elevation , on the border of Ecuador and Colombia. The river flows eastward across the high plateau of El Angel. It passes between the cities of Tulcan, Ecuador and Ipiales, Colombia and beneath the Rumichaca Bridge, the principal terrestrial link between Colombia and Ecuador. Entering Colombia, the Carchi becomes known as the Guáitara River which is a tributary of the Patía River.     

The Pasto people lived along the Carchi River in pre-Columbian times. At the northernmost point of the Inca Empire  the Pasto were never fully conquered by the Incas.  The Carchi was known as the Angasmayo River by the Incas and the early Spanish colonists.  A natural stone bridge at Rumichaca was the northernmost outpost of the Inca Empire.

See also
List of rivers of Ecuador
 Rand McNally, The New International Atlas, 1993.
  GEOnet Names Server 
 Water Resources Assessment of Ecuador

References
 

Rivers of Ecuador
Geography of Carchi Province
Colombia–Ecuador border
International rivers of South America
Rivers of Colombia
Border rivers